{{Infobox person
| name               = 
| image              = Harry Michaels.jpg
| caption            = A portrait of Harry Michaels
| birth_name         = 
| birth_place        = 
| occupation         = 
| known for          = Number 96| yearsactive        = 
| awards             = Order of Australia (OAM)
}}
Harry Michaels, (OAM), is an Australian entrepreneur, active in both the soccer and television industries as an actor, director and producer, he is of Greek Cypriot descent.

Career
Television career
Harry Michaels shot to fame in the late 1970s in the TV series Number 96, as Italian deli assistant Giovanni Lenzi, having previously appeared in that series in a guest role
Michaels pioneered English-language ethnic television, as the host of Greek Affair and The Greek Variety Show'' which were broadcast on Network 10 in the 1980s.

Acting and hosting credits
 Odyssey: A Journey (TV movie (1974) 
 Number 96 as Giovanni Lenzi
 Cop Shop  as Father Andropolous
 Cathy's Child (1979 film) as taxi driver
 Special Squad as Lou Spiera
 The Tourist (TV movie) Anwan

Producer credits
 Aerobics Oz Style television series and exercise videos.

Director credits
 2006 – Australia v Greece,
 2005 – Australia v Iraq, Australia v Solomon Islands, Australia v Indonesia, 
 2002 – UEFA Cup in Greece: Aek v Inter Milan, 
 1998 – Australia v Iran (Logie Award winning), Australia v Uruguay 2006 World Cup Qualifier 
 1993 – World Youth Championships (directed & produced) 
 1986–1996 – Australian National Soccer League
 2010–2011 – Sky News "The Nation" and "Australian Agenda"

Honours
Harry Michaels, was honoured with the Order of Australia (OAM) in 2004, with the citation "For service to multicultural media and soccer".

References

External links

Living people
Year of birth missing (living people)
Australian male film actors
Australian people of Greek Cypriot descent